Johnsonia may refer to:
Johnsonia (journal), a journal of malacology
Johnsonia (fly), a genus of flies in the family Sarcophagidae
Johnsonia (plant), a genus of plants in the family Asphodelaceae